Below are the rosters for the 1997 Tournoi de France tournament in France.
 Players who were called to play 1998 FIFA World Cup in bold.

Brazil

Head coach: Mário Zagallo

England

Le Tournoi gave England manager Glenn Hoddle a valuable opportunity to work with his chosen squad for three and a half weeks, as well as to field a experimental side in the game against Italy which "blended a caucus of Manchester United youth with some Premiership wrinklies". England's victory against France was their first since 1949, but after their exit in the last 16 of the World Cup the following year and departure of Hoddle seven months later, Le Tournoi was a "reminder of unfulfilled promise".

France

Head coach: Aimé Jacquet

Italy

Head coach: Cesare Maldini

References

1997 Tournoi de France